Pauline Ferrand-Prévot (born 10 February 1992) is a French multi-discipline bicycle racer, who rides for UCI Elite Mountain Bike team BMC MTB Racing in cross-country cycling. and has signed for Ineos Grenadiers for 2023. Ferrand-Prévot has also competed in road bicycle racing and cyclo-cross during her career, winning the world title in each discipline. During the 2015 season, aged just 23, she became the first person ever – in the history of cycling – to simultaneously hold the World road title, World cyclo-cross title and World cross-country mountain bike title.

Ferrand-Prévot is an elite world champion and national champion across the various disciplines in which she competes. She was the youngest competitor in the Women's road race at the 2012 Summer Olympics, in which she finished eighth.

Career

2009–2010: Triple Junior World Champion
In July 2009, Ferrand-Prévot took part in the European Road Championships as a first year junior, where she narrowly won the Junior European time trial title ahead of Ukrainian Hanna Solovey. Four days later she placed third in the road race. Later in the same month, she won the junior European cross country championships, taking her second European title in less than 10 days in two different disciplines. She then participated in the World Junior Championships, winning silver in the time trial behind Hanna Solovey. In late August Ferrand-Prévot won both National Road titles in the junior category. In September, she won her first world title at the World cross country championship, whilst in October, she won the junior Chrono des Nations.

Ferrand-Prévot began her 2010 season competing in cyclo-cross. For women, there is no junior category which meant that she had to compete with the elite athletes. She came eighth in the World Cyclo-cross championships, more than two minutes behind future teammate Marianne Vos. After the cyclo-cross season, she was victorious at the City of Pujols road race, one of the constituent rounds of the Coupe de France, and would go on to top the final ranking in the Coupe de France for juniors. Further, she won a stage of the Circuit de Borsele junior, finishing fourth overall. She competed in the junior mountain bike World Cup, winning the Offenburg round and finished second in the Houffalize round. In mid-July, at the European Championships, Ferrand-Prévot had to settle for silver in both the time trial and road race. Ferrand-Prévot then competed in the junior World road race Championships in Offida, Italy finishing second in the time trial. She retained her junior national road titles. In September she defended successfully the junior Mountain bike world championships in MTB at Mont-Sainte-Anne in Canada, becoming the second rider after Nicole Cooke to hold both World Championship titles in the same year on the road and in mountain biking.

2011–2013: The first professional years
Ferrand-Prévot began the 2011 season with a second place in the national cyclo-cross championships. In late January, she took eighth in the World Championship cyclo-cross. She was then selected to participate in the Trofeo Alfredo Binda-Comune di Cittiglio for the French national road team, the first round of the 2011 UCI Women's Road World Cup achieving ninth place. After a fourth place in Halle-Buizingen, she finished seventh in the women's La Flèche Wallonne atop the Mur de Huy. In May, she went on to participate in two rounds of the UCI Under-23 MTB World Cup taking victory in both rounds. Ferrand-Prévot stated in mid-May that she would continue to ride in both disciplines for at least two more seasons. After a victory in the Coupe de France she participated in the two North American rounds of the Under-23 MTB World Cup winning both rounds again.

In July one year ahead of the London Olympics, she finished fifth in the pre-Olympic race. She then abandoned the MTB European championship. In August, after taking second place in the Val di Sole round of the Under-23 MTB World cup, she was crowned the overall winner. In November Ferrand-Prévot won the bronze medal at the European Cyclo-cross championships. In late November,  announced they had signed her for the 2012 and 2013 seasons.

In April 2012, Ferrand-Prévot achieved her first podium in the MTB World Cup, during the second round in Houffalize. She was then selected for the Olympic Mountain bike test event. In June, at Saint-Amand-les-Eaux, she won her first elite national time trial championship, completing the  loop in 36 minutes and 55 seconds, beating Audrey Cordon-Ragot by 17 seconds. She also won the Under-23 title. In July, she finished fourth in the elite national Mountain Bike championships but won the Under-23 title.

2014: The career year

Early in the season, Ferrand-Prévot won her first elite national cyclo-cross title. In late March, she finished fifth at the Trofeo Alfredo Binda-Comune di Cittiglio. In April she won the La Flèche Wallonne Féminine ahead of Lizzie Armitstead and Elisa Longo Borghini. In July, Ferrand-Prévot came second in the Giro Rosa just 15 seconds behind teammate Marianne Vos becoming the second French woman to reach the podium of the Giro Rosa after the Catherine Marsal victory in 1990. She later took the overall victory at the Emakumeen Euskal Bira, her first stage race win, while collecting two stage wins.

In July, Ferrand-Prévot became the first French cyclist to accumulate four national titles in a single season (road race, time trial, cyclo-cross and mountain bike). She also recorded two wins in the elite Mountain Bike World Cup and finally finished tenth overall in the Mountain Bike World Cup. After taking victory at the Under-23 European Cross-Country Championships, she won her first world title in the mixed relay.

Late in the road season, Ferrand-Prévot took part in the Grand Prix de Plouay, last round of the Road World Cup, taking 3rd place. She later finished sixth overall in the competition. In September, 19 years after Jeannie Longo won the fabled rainbow jersey, she became World Road Race champion in Ponferrada, Spain. Later in the season, she finished second in the Vélo d'or Français behind Jean-Christophe Péraud and ahead of track World Champion François Pervis. Ferrand-Prévot was also selected "international cyclist of the year" by the American publication VeloNews.

2015: World champion in cyclo-cross and cross-country

Ferrand-Prévot started the season off with retaining her national cyclo-cross championship. A week of ahead of the cyclo-cross world championships, she finished on the podium in the final race of the cyclo-cross World Cup in Hoogerheide. In January, she won the Cyclo-cross world title, ahead of Sanne Cant and seven-time champion Marianne Vos. She finished runner-up at the Trofeo Alfredo Binda-Comune di Cittiglio behind Lizzie Armitstead. In June, Ferrand-Prévot announced she had been suffering from sciatica which had ruined the start of her season. She returned to competition in the French national road race championships retaining her road title but only finishing third in the time trial. At the Giro Rosa, she finished ninth in the prologue but lost nearly two minutes on the leaders after the second stage. Winner of Stage 5 at Aprica, she finished 6th overall.

In August, Ferrand-Prévot started her mountain bike season with the goal of achieving a third world title in three different disciplines. She finished third in the Mont-Sainte-Anne round of World Cup and won the Windham round by more than a minute. On the road, she suffered a fall in the last kilometer of La Course by Le Tour de France as she did in 2014, but then went on to come third again at the Grand Prix de Plouay.

In the World mountain biking championship, she retained her mixed relay title (with Jordan Sarrou, Anthony Phillip and Victor Koretzky) and then added the World cross-country title.

In late November 2015 Ferrand-Prévot acquired a tibial plateau fracture during training, forcing her to refrain from racing for at least six weeks and miss most of the 2015–2016 cyclocross season.

2016

Ferrand-Prévot endured a difficult 2016 season. She competed in the 2016 Summer Olympics in Rio de Janeiro, however she only finished 26th in the road race and abandoned the cross-country mountain bike race due to struggling with the effects of the tibial fracture she had sustained during the winter. She subsequently ended her season after the Games. In September 2016, after five years with the Rabobank team it was announced that Ferrand-Prévot would join  for the 2017 season.

2018
She was on the start list of the Cross Country European Championships in Glasgow and finished 2nd behind Jolanda Neff.

Personal life
Ferrand-Prévot comes from a cycling family; her uncle Ludovic Dubau was 1994 French champion in cross-country mountain biking and competed in the 2000 Summer Olympics.

Career achievements

Major championships timeline

Cyclo-cross

2009–2010
 Coupe de France
2nd Saint-Quentin
3rd Besançon
 3rd National Championships
2010–2011
 2nd National Championships
 Coupe de France
2nd Saint-Jean-de-Monts
3rd Saverne
3rd Miramas
2011–2012
 1st Overall Coupe la France
1st Rodez
2nd Lignières-en-Berry
3rd Besançon
 2nd National Championships
 Superprestige
2nd Hamme
 3rd  UEC European Championships
2012–2013
 1st Overall Coupe de France
1st Pontchâteau
2nd Besançon
 2nd National Championships
2013–2014
 1st  National Championships
 Coupe de France
1st Flamanville
 2nd Kalmthout
2014–2015
 1st  UCI World Championships
 1st  National Championships
 Superprestige
2nd Diegem
 2nd Overijse
 2nd Hasselt
 UCI World Cup
3rd Heusden-Zolder
3rd Hoogerheide
2017–2018
 1st  National Championships
 1st Overijse
 Superprestige
2nd Diegem
 UCI World Cup
3rd Nommay

UCI World Cup results

Gravel
2022
 1st  UCI World Championships

Mountain Bike

2009
 1st  Cross-country, UCI World Junior Championships
 1st  Cross-country, UEC European Junior Championships
 3rd Cross-country, National Junior Championships
2010
 1st  Cross-country, UCI World Junior Championships
 UCI Junior XCO World Cup
1st Offenburg
2nd Houffalize
2011
 1st  Overall UCI Under-23 XCO World Cup
1st Dalby Forest
1st Offenburg
1st Mont-Sainte-Anne
1st Windham
2nd Val di Sole
3rd Nové Město
 3rd  Cross-country, UCI World Under-23 Championships
2012
 1st  Cross-country, National Under-23 Championships
2013
 1st  Cross-country, National Under-23 Championships
 1st Saint-Pompon
 2nd  Cross-country, UCI World Under-23 Championships
 2nd Cross-country, National Championships
2014
 1st  Team relay, UCI World Championships
 1st  Cross-country, UEC European Under-23 Championships
 1st  Cross-country, National Championships
 1st  Cross-country, National Under-23 Championships
 UCI XCO World Cup
1st Nové Město
1st Albstadt
3rd Méribel
 1st Lons-le-Saunier
2015
 UCI World Championships
1st  Cross-country
1st  Team relay
 1st  Cross-country, National Championships
 UCI XCO World Cup
1st Windham
3rd Nové Město
3rd Mont-Sainte-Anne
 1st Saint-Pompon
2016
 1st  Team relay, UCI World Championships
 1st  Cross-country, National Championships
2017
 1st Roc d'Azur
 UCI XCO World Cup
2nd Mont-Sainte-Anne
 UCI World Championships
3rd  Cross-country
3rd  Team relay
2018
 2nd  Cross-country, UEC European Championships
 UCI XCO World Cup
2nd Stellenbosch
3rd Nové Město
 UCI XCC World Cup
2nd Nové Město
2019
 UCI World Championships
1st  Cross-country
1st  Marathon
 1st  Cross-country, National Championships
 UCI XCO World Cup
1st Val di Sole
1st Snowshoe
3rd Lenzerheide
 UCI XCC World Cup
1st Lenzerheide
2nd Les Gets
2nd Snowshoe
3rd Val di Sole
 Internazionali d’Italia Series
2nd La Thuile
 French Cup
3rd Jeumont
 Swiss Bike Cup
3rd Leukerbad
2020
 1st  Cross-country, UCI World Championships
 1st  Cross-country, UEC European Championships
 1st  Overall UCI XCO World Cup
1st Nové Město II
3rd Nové Město I
 UCI XCC World Cup
2nd Nové Město I
2nd Nové Město II
 3rd Marathon, National Championships
2021
 1st  Cross-country, UEC European Championships
 UCI XCC World Cup
1st Albstadt
1st Les Gets
 2nd Cross-country, National Championships
 UCI XCO World Cup
2nd Albstadt
 French Cup
2nd Lons-le-Saunier
 Internazionali d’Italia Series
2nd Nalles
 3rd  Short track, UCI World Championships
 Swiss Bike Cup
3rd Leukerbad
2022
 UCI World Championships
1st  Cross-country
1st  Short track
1st  Marathon
 National Championships
1st  Short track
2nd Cross-country
2nd Marathon
 UCI XCO World Cup
1st Val di Sole
 UCI XCC World Cup
1st Petropolis
1st Val di Sole
2nd Albstadt
 1st Roc d'Azur
 2nd  Cross-country, UEC European Championships
 French Cup
2nd Le Dévoluy
 3rd Overall Cape Epic (with Robyn de Groot)

UCI World Cup results

Road

2009
 UEC European Junior Championships
1st  Time trial
3rd  Road race
 National Junior Championships
1st  Road race
1st  Time trial
 UCI World Junior Championships
2nd  Road race
2nd  Time trial
2010
 UCI World Junior Championships
1st  Road race
2nd  Time trial
 National Junior Championships
1st  Road race
1st  Time trial
 UEC European Junior Championships
2nd  Road race
2nd  Time trial
2011
 4th Time trial, National Championships
 4th Halle-Buizingen
 5th Grand Prix Elsy Jacobs
 5th Grand Prix Nicolas Frantz
 7th La Flèche Wallonne
 9th Trofeo Alfredo Binda
2012
 1st  Time trial, National Championships
 1st  Time trial, National Under-23 Championships
 1st  Sprints classification, Holland Ladies Tour
 2nd Omloop van het Hageland
 5th Omloop Het Nieuwsblad
 7th Trofeo Alfredo Binda
 7th 7-Dorpenomloop Aalburg
 8th Overall Festival Luxembourgeois Elsy Jacobs
 8th Road race, Olympic Games
 10th Ronde van Drenthe
 10th Holland Hills Classic
2013
 1st  Time trial, National Championships
 1st  Time trial, National Under-23 Championships
 2nd  Team time trial, UCI World Championships
 3rd Dwars door de Westhoek
 4th Grand Prix Leende
 8th Overall La Route de France
1st  Young rider classification
2014
 1st  Road race, UCI World Championships
 National Championships
1st  Road race
1st  Time trial
 National Under-23 Championships
1st  Road race
1st  Time trial
 1st  Overall Emakumeen Euskal Bira
1st Stages 1 & 3
 1st La Flèche Wallonne
 2nd Overall Giro Rosa
1st  Young rider classification
 3rd GP de Plouay
 5th Overall Festival Luxembourgeois Elsy Jacobs
1st  Mountains classification
1st  Young rider classification
 5th Trofeo Alfredo Binda
 6th EPZ Omloop van Borsele
2015
 National Championships
1st  Road race
3rd Time trial
 2nd Trofeo Alfredo Binda
 3rd GP de Plouay
 5th Overall Festival Luxembourgeois Elsy Jacobs
 6th Road race, UCI World Championships
 6th Overall Giro Rosa
1st Stage 5
 7th Tour of Flanders
 8th La Flèche Wallonne
2016
 4th Pajot Hills Classic
 8th Tour of Flanders
2017
 2nd GP de Plouay
 8th Amstel Gold Race
2018
 6th Trofeo Alfredo Binda
 7th Liège–Bastogne–Liège
 9th Overall Setmana Ciclista Valenciana
 9th Overall The Women's Tour
2021
 5th Time trial, National Championships

Awards
Velo magazine – International Cyclist of the year: 2014
French Sportswoman of the Year: 2014, 2015, 2020

References

External links

 
 

1992 births
Living people
French female cyclists
Olympic cyclists of France
Cyclists at the 2012 Summer Olympics
Cyclists at the 2016 Summer Olympics
Sportspeople from Reims
UCI Road World Champions (women)
Cross-country mountain bikers
UCI Mountain Bike World Champions (women)
Université Savoie-Mont Blanc alumni
UCI Cyclo-cross World Champions (women)
Cyclists at the 2020 Summer Olympics
Cyclists from Grand Est
UCI Gravel World Champions (women)